Kentucky Route 32 (KY 32) is a 161.773-mile state highway in Kentucky that runs from US 62 in Georgetown to KY 3 in Louisa.

Route description

Major intersections

Flemingsburg business route

Kentucky Route 32 Business (KY 32 Bus.) is a  business route through Flemingsburg.

Major intersections

0.135

References

0032
Transportation in Scott County, Kentucky
Transportation in Harrison County, Kentucky
Transportation in Bourbon County, Kentucky
Transportation in Nicholas County, Kentucky
Transportation in Fleming County, Kentucky
Transportation in Rowan County, Kentucky
Transportation in Elliott County, Kentucky
Transportation in Lawrence County, Kentucky